Bukar Abba Ibrahim (1949) was governor of Yobe State in Nigeria from 29 May 1999 to 29 May 2007. He also served as governor of the state from January 1992 to November 1993. He is a member of the All Nigeria People's Party (ANPP).

Background
Ibrahim began attending primary school in 1957. In 1965, he proceeded to Government College in Maiduguri. After taking the West African School Certificate Examination in 1970, he was admitted to Ahmadu Bello University in 1972 where he obtained his Bachelor of Science degree in Quantity Surveying in 1975. Thereafter, he undertook post-graduate professional training in the United Kingdom from 1981 to 1982, which led to his qualification as an associate member of the Nigeria Institute of Quantity Surveyors.

From 1985 to 1988, he worked as a civil servant in Borno State eventually becoming Commissioner of Works.

Ibrahim, a Muslim, is married to three wives: Hajiya (Dr) Maryam Abba Ibrahim, Hajiya Aishatu Ibrahim and Hajiya Khadijat Ibrahim.

Gubernatorial career
In December 1991, a few months after Yobe State was created, Ibrahim contested and won the gubernatorial election under the banner of the Social Democratic Party (SDP). He held that position until November 1993, when the military took control of government.

Nigeria transitioned from military to civilian rule beginning in late 1998. Gubernatorial elections were held in January 1999 and Ibrahim was again elected governor, this time under the banner of the All People's Party (APP), and took office on 29 May 1999. The APP was later renamed All Nigeria People's Party (ANPP) due to a factional split. He was re-elected in 2003 for a second four-year term and was one of only four incumbent ANPP governors to maintain their positions.

During his first term, on 5 August 1993 Ibrahim split the state's four emirates into 13. This change was reversed by the military regime of Sani Abacha. In his second term after the return to democracy, on 6 January 2000, he re-implemented the new emirates, adding Ngazargamu, Gujba, Nguru, Tikau, Pataskum, Yusufari, Gudi, Fune and Jajere.
The Emir of Fika, Muhammadu Abali, protested at the break-up of his emirate and took the government to court, but eventually accepted the change.

Senatorial career
In 2007, he was elected to the Senate for the Yobe East constituency. He ran for re-election in the 9 April 2011 Senatorial contest for Yobe East on the ANPP platform, and won with 115,763 votes against former Senator Lawan Jalo Zarami of the People's Democratic Party (PDP), who gained 67,438 votes.

References

1949 births
Living people
Governors of Yobe State
Members of the Senate (Nigeria)
All People's Party (Nigeria) politicians
Social Democratic Party (Nigeria) politicians
All Nigeria Peoples Party politicians
21st-century Nigerian politicians
Ahmadu Bello University alumni
All Progressives Congress politicians
Nigerian Muslims